Rules of Engagement is a science fiction novel by British write Peter Morwood. Part of the Star Trek: The Original Series franchise, it was published by Pocket Books in 1990.

Plot
James T. Kirk is sent to assist in the evacuation of Federation personnel from the crisis-wracked planet of Dekkanar. He is ordered to only participate in the evacuation, not to even raise shields or fire weapons. The situation becomes complicated when Captain Kasak takes an experimental Klingon warship to the planet as well.

The novel also offers an alternate explanation, via Kasak's viewpoint, of why Klingons' facial features have changed over the years.

Reception
The novel entered the New York Times Best Seller list for paperbacks at #13 on February 4, 1990. The book moved up to #10 the following week (with a note that its sales were indistinguishable from the #9 book). The book peaked at #8 in the February 18, 1990, listing before slipping back to #13 on February 25, 1990, and falling off the list after that.

References

External links

Novels based on Star Trek: The Original Series
1990 American novels
American science fiction novels
Pocket Books books